Kukuyevka is a rural locality (a selo) and the administrative center of Kukuyevskoye Rural Settlement, Valuysky District, Belgorod Oblast, Russia. The population was 411 as of 2010. There are 4 streets.

Geography 
Kukuyevka is located 27 km southwest of Valuyki (the district's administrative centre) by road. Dolgoye is the nearest rural locality.

References 

Rural localities in Valuysky District